Geographic Information Systems (GIS) are an increasingly important component of business, healthcare, security, government, trade, media, transportation and tourism industries and operations in China. GIS software is playing an increasing role in the way Chinese companies analyze and manage business operations.

History

Geographic information systems (GIS) first became widely available in the 1980s and 1990s, when the only source of geographic data for China was paper maps. Several universities undertook the task of digitizing this information so researchers could use it.

The two earliest projects were conducted by The Australian Consortium for the Asian Spatial Information and Analysis Network (ACASIAN) at Griffith University and the China Data Center at the University of Michigan at Ann Arbor. ACASIAN specialized in spatial coverage while the China Data Center included GIS coverage in their mission to provide Chinese statistical and census data.

High-quality GIS data is produced in China by both government organizations and private companies. China's National Spatial Data Infrastructure Project uses the WGS84 standard. The partial timeline is:

In 1991, China's first color Map Editing and Publication System, MapCAD.
In 1995, China's first National Advanced GIS Software, Computer based GIS, MapGIS.
In 2005, The fourth generation of large-scale distributed structure GIS, MapGIS 7.0
In 2009, China's GIS new ero—MapGIS K9.

Geographic Names Information System

In the early 1980s, China began studies for the establishment of its Geographic Names Information System and Geographic Names Information System Research Laboratory, and the establishment of the National Atlas of Geographical Names database research.

Education
The China Association for Geographic Information System, Peking University and other institutes sponsored the first "Innovation and Development, 2006 College GIS Forum" in Beijing. More than 300 experts attended the forum. Sessions involved China's GIS research in multi-disciplinary fields, personnel training, and technology. China has now more than 500 institutions of higher learning training GIS-related professionals, of which more than 200 universities and colleges have established a GIS lab.

Industry

The GIS industry in China is worth 400 billion yuan per annum as of November 2007. More than 300,000 people were involved in either building or using these systems, according to Zondy Cyber Group president Wu Xincai, who is also the president of the China Association for Geographic Information System. Almost 20,000 enterprises are estimated to have engaged in the industry. The biggest vendor of GIS in China is Zondy Cyber Group, followed by SuperMap. Around 2,000 of these have GIS as a core discipline or function. The industry's rapid expansion is attributed to China's economic development, which has led to an increase in capital input, from both government and businesses. Between 2001 and 2005, the Ministry of Information Industry allocated more than 20 million yuan to fund the development and application of GIS. GIS has been used in land survey, mineral exploitation, water conservancy and environmental protection. It also has applications in power generation, mapping, telecommunication, and the management of public administration and public services.

Notable persons
Chen Shupeng (1920–2008) is considered the founder of remote sensing and GIS in China. Chen started the State Key Laboratory of Resources and Environmental Information System (LREIS) in 1987.

Institutions
Major institutions include:

 National Geographic Information System
 National Fundamental Geographic Information System
 National Geomatics Center of China
 State Bureau of Surveying and Mapping
 Institute of Soil Sciences, The Chinese Academy of Sciences
 The Data Sharing Network of Earth System Science
 SuperMap is a stand-alone GIS program and data provider. They have several large contracts with the Chinese government and are one of the few sources for 1:500 scale map data which they offer for a limited number of cities.
 MapWorld provides 1:10,000 and 1:25,000 scale data on a range of topics from administrative boundaries to facilities management. They provide datum and projection information and prepare data in either ESRI or MapInfo formats.
 Beijing Creation Science & Technology Development specializes in personalized data sets at any scale. They also prepare and process satellite images.
 State Key Laboratory of Resources and Environmental Information System (LREIS)
 Laboratory of Remote Sensing and Geospatial Science
 China University of Geosciences

Global navigation satellite system
 BeiDou Navigation Satellite System is used for GIS data gathering

See also 

 Canada Geographic Information System
 China Historical Geographic Information System
 Geographic information system
 Geoinformatics
 Historical geographic information system
 Information science
 National Historical Geographic Information System
 Restrictions on geographic data in China

Notes

References 
 Jiang Jingtong, and Liu Ruomei, "China Profile Of The International Standard: Geographic Information – Metadata.”  Presented at ICC2005 – International Cartographic Conference, La Coruna, Spain, July 9–16, 2005.
 GIS DATA FOR CHINA Michele Ladenson and Zhixiang Lu, University of Texas-Dallas, November 2006
 Recent Progress in China’s NSDI Development
 On Developing Spatial Data Infrastructure of China 
 The Exemplary Effect of GeoStar in the Spatial Data Infrastructure Construction in China
 Framework and development of digital China 
 Applications of Remote Sensing and Geographic Information System in China in China’s Land Survey, Evaluation and Administration
 Leader of geographical information system studies in China
 Development of geographic information systems (GIS) in China: An overview

Geographic data and information by country
Geographic information systems
Geography of China

zh:地理信息系统